Dilbag Singh (born 4 September 1981) Dilbag Singh is an Indian boxer.

Amateur boxing career
Singh won the bronze medal in the 2010 Commonwealth Games in the Welterweight category.

Professional boxing career
Singh turned professional in 2015.

Controversies
Singh was accused of allegedly manipulation the trials for the World Championship.Singh also failed a dope test, he had tested positive for methylhexaneamine after winning gold in the Jharkhand National Games 2011.

References

Commonwealth Games bronze medallists for India
1981 births
Living people
Indian male boxers
Commonwealth Games medallists in boxing
Place of birth missing (living people)
Boxers at the 2006 Asian Games
Boxers at the 2010 Asian Games
Boxers at the 2010 Commonwealth Games
Asian Games competitors for India
Welterweight boxers
Medallists at the 2010 Commonwealth Games